This is a list of media in St. John's, Newfoundland and Labrador.

Radio
St. John's is currently the only Canadian city served by radio stations whose call letters do not all begin with the letter C. The ITU prefix VO was assigned to the Dominion of Newfoundland before the province joined Canadian Confederation in 1949, and three AM stations kept their existing call letters; the Broadcasting Corporation of Newfoundland's VONF, however, was taken over by CBC Radio and adopted the new call sign CBN. However, radio stations in St. John's which went to air after 1949 use the same range of prefixes (CF–CK) currently in use elsewhere in Canada, with the exception of VOCM-FM, which was permitted to adopt the VOCM callsign because of its corporate association with the AM station that already bore that callsign. VO also remains in use in amateur radio.

Television

Rogers Cable has its provincial headquarters in St. John’s and is the incumbent cable provider in the city. Its community channel Rogers TV airs local shows such as Out of the Fog and One Chef One Critic. Network television in the United States is piped in from Boston and Detroit via Rogers Cable.

Print
 The Telegram (daily newspaper)
 Newfoundland Quarterly (literary magazine founded in 1901, now published by Memorial University)
 The Independent (weekly newspaper, discontinued in print but available online) 
 The Express (weekly newspaper, now discontinued)
 The Muse (formerly weekly or, during summer months, bi-monthly Memorial University student newspaper) – The Muse stopped print circulation in the fall of 2017 in order to deal with ongoing budget difficulties and is now a strictly online publication.
 The Gazette ( bi-monthly Memorial University newspaper)
 Le Gaboteur (Newfoundland and Labrador's only French-language newspaper; bi-monthly)
 The Scope (a defunct alternative newspaper)
 The Overcast (St. John's Monthly Alternative Newspaper)
 The Daily News'' (1955– 1963)

Online
AllNewfoundlandLabrador.com is an online newspaper which covers business news from around the province.  The subscription news service publishes five days a week and was launched in 2016 by sister publication allNovaScotia which is based in Halifax, Nova Scotia.  The two publications have a newsroom staff of 19 reporters, editors and columnists.

References

Saint John's

Media, St. John's